This is a list of notable Urbano artists (musicians, singers, rappers, and producers and groups).

Argentina
Bizarrap
Cazzu
Duki
Emilia
J Mena
Khea
Lali
Lit Killah
L-Gante
Midel
Nathy Peluso
Nicki Nicole
Oriana
Paulo Londra
Tini
Trueno

Brazil
Anitta
Black Alien & Speed
Deize Tigrona
DJ Marlboro

Chile
Ana Tijoux
Paloma Mami
Tomasa del Real

Colombia 
Andy Rivera
Cali & El Dandee
Farina
Feid
Greeicy
J Balvin
Juanes
Karol G
Kevin Roldán
Lalo Ebratt
Maluma
Manuel Turizo
Piso 21
Reykon
Sebastián Yatra
Shakira

Cuba
Cubanito 20.02
Cuban Link
Eddy-K
El Medico
Gente de Zona
Mey Vidal
Osmani García
Pitbull

Dominican Republic
Deevani
Doble A
Don Miguelo
Natti Natasha
Noztra
Luny Tunes
El Alfa el jefe

El Salvador
Crooked Stilo
Heavy Clan
Pescozada

Mexico
C-Kan
Danna Paola
Ingratax
MC Davo
Sofia Reyes

Nicaragua
Torombolo

Panama
 Gaby
El Chombo
La Factoría
Fito Blanko
El General
Latin Fresh
Lorna
Nando Boom
Flex
Renée and Renato
El Roockie
Eddy Lover
Makano
Aldo Ranks
Joey Montana
Sech

Peru 
A. Chal
Leslie Shaw
Mayra Goñi
Faraón Love Shady

Puerto Rico
Anuel AA
Baby Rasta & Gringo
Bad Bunny
Brytiago
Calle 13 (band)
Casa de Leones
Chris Jeday
Cosculluela
Daddy Yankee 
Dalex
Darell
Darkiel
DJ Nelson
Don Omar
Eddie Dee
Farruko
Franco "El Gorila"
Getto & Gastam
Glory (singer) 
Héctor & Tito
Kany García
Ivy Queen
J Álvarez
Jowell & Randy
Julio Voltio
Kendo Kaponi
O.G. Black
Ozuna
Lito & Polaco
Luis Fonsi
Lunay
Magnate & Valentino
Maicol & Manuel
Mexicano 777
MC Ceja
Miguelito
Myke Towers
Ñejo & Dalmata
Nely
Ñengo Flow
Nio Garcia
Noriel
Nova & Jory
Plan B
Pusho
R.K.M & Ken-Y
Rauw Alejandro
Residente
Ricky Martin
Speedy
Tainy
Tego Calderon
Tempo (rapper)
Tony Dize
Trebol Clan
Wisin & Yandel
Yaga & Mackie
Vico C
Zion & Lennox

Mexico
Akwid
Cartel de Santa
Control Machete
Kinto Sol

Spain
Abraham Mateo
Ana Mena
Bad Gyal
Enrique Iglesias
K-Narias
Lola Indigo
Mala Rodriguez
Omar Montes
Rosalía

United States
Adassa
Arcángel & De La Ghetto
Becky G
Chosen Few
CNCO
Divino
El Chombo
Lele Pons
Leslie Grace
Lumidee
Mariah Angeliq
N.O.R.E.
Notch
Nina Sky
Prince Royce
Romeo Santos
Snoop Lion
Tony Touch
Vico C
Yomo

References

 
Urbano music